Foolishness for Christ refers to behavior such as giving up all one's worldly possessions upon joining an ascetic order or religious life, or deliberately flouting society's conventions to serve a religious purpose—particularly of Christianity. Such individuals have historically been known as both "holy fools" and "blessed fools". The term "fool" connotes what is perceived as feeblemindedness, and "blessed" or "holy" refers to innocence in the eyes of God.

The term fools for Christ derives from the writings of Saint Paul. Desert Fathers and other saints acted the part of Holy Fools, as have the yurodivy (or iurodstvo) of Eastern Orthodox asceticism. Fools for Christ often employ shocking and unconventional behavior to challenge accepted norms, deliver prophecies, or to mask their piety.

Old Testament 
Certain prophets of the Old Testament who exhibited signs of strange behaviour are considered by some scholars to be predecessors of "Fools for Christ".  The prophet Isaiah walked naked and barefoot for about three years, predicting a forthcoming captivity in Egypt; the prophet Ezekiel lay before a stone, which symbolized beleaguered Jerusalem, and though God instructed him to eat bread baked on human waste, ultimately he asked to use cow dung instead; Hosea married a harlot to symbolize the infidelity of Israel before God.

By the opinion of certain scholars, these prophets were not counted as fools by their contemporaries, as they just carried out separate actions to attract people's attention and to awake their repentance.

New Testament 

According to Christian ideas, "foolishness" included consistent rejection of worldly cares and imitating Christ, who endured mockery and humiliation from the crowd. The spiritual meaning of "foolishness" from the early ages of Christianity was closely related to that of rejection of common social rules of hypocrisy, brutality and quest for power and gains.

By the words of Anthony the Great: "Here comes the time, when people will behave like madmen, and if they see anybody who does not behave like that, they will rebel against him and say: 'You are mad', — because he is not like them."

Paul the Apostle

"We are fools for Christ's sake, but ye are wise in Christ; we are weak, but ye are strong; ye are honourable, but we are despised." (KJV).

And also:

"For the wisdom of this world is foolishness in God's sight. As it is written: 'He catches the wise in their craftiness.'"

"For the message of the cross is foolishness to those who are perishing, but to us who are being saved it is the power of God."

"For since in the wisdom of God the world through its wisdom did not know him, God was pleased through the foolishness of what was preached to save those who believe."

Western Christianity 

In Western Christianity there have been several saints who lived lives which were rather eccentric and seemingly foolish. Among the earliest of them is St. Nicholas of Trani a young homeless man who died in 1094 AD. He apparently never stopped repeating the phrase 'Kyrie Eleison' and behaved foolishly. Similarly Blessed Peter of Foligno lived in voluntary poverty and was deemed crazy. 

Other notable lay men who led saintly albeit eccentric lifestyles were Blessed Peter of Trevi,  Teobaldo Roggeri, Benedict Joseph Labre, St. Salaun of Brittany Ludovico Morbioli and Casimiro Barello among others. The key characteristics of foolishness for Christ in Western Christianity are sleeping rough and homelessness, a minimalistic lifestyle with very few if any possessions and a strict dedication to prayer and self-renunciation.

Some ascetics are known as mendicants and are organised into mendicant orders. The most famous example in the Western church is Francis of Assisi, whose order was known for following the teachings of Christ and walking in his footsteps. Thus, upon joining the order, Franciscans gave away all possessions and focused on preaching in the streets to the common man.

Servant of God, Brother Juniper, an early follower of the Franciscan order, was known for taking the doctrine of the Franciscans to the extreme. Whenever anyone asked for any of his possessions, he freely gave them away, including his clothes. He once even cut off the bells from his altar-cloth and gave them to a poor woman. His fellow Franciscans had to watch him closely, and strictly forbade him from giving away his clothes. While such behaviors were embarrassing to his brothers, he was also recognized as a pure example of the Franciscan order and thus esteemed.

"The Little Flowers of Saint Francis of Assisi",<ref>Hudleston, Dom R. (1953) The Little Flowers of Saint Francis of Assissi", 1st English translation, revised and amended. London: Burns & Oates.</ref> which documents the oral traditions of the Franciscans, told several stories of "Brother Juniper". The most famous of these is the story of how Brother Juniper, when he heard a sick brother request a pig's foot as a meal, Brother Juniper took a kitchen knife and ran into the forest, where he saw a herd of swine feeding. There, he quickly cut the foot off of one of the swine and carried it back to the brother, leaving the swine to die. This angered the herdsman, who complained to Saint Francis. Saint Francis confronted Brother Juniper, who joyfully exclaimed, "It is true, sweet father, that I did cut off the swine's foot. I will tell thee the reason. I went out of charity to visit the brother who is sick." Brother Juniper likewise explained to the angry herdsman who, seeing the "charity, simplicity, and humility" (Hudleston, 1953) in Brother Juniper's heart, forgave him and delivered the rest of the pig to the brothers.

 Eastern Christianity 

The Holy Fool or yuródivyy (юродивый) is the Russian version of  foolishness for Christ, a peculiar form of Eastern Orthodox asceticism. The yurodivy is a Holy Fool, one who acts intentionally foolish in the eyes of men. The term implies behaviour "which is caused neither by mistake nor by feeble-mindedness, but is deliberate, irritating, even provocative."

In his book Holy Fools in Byzantium and Beyond, Ivanov described "holy fool" as a term for a person who "feigns insanity, pretends to be foolish, or who provokes shock or outrage by his deliberate unruliness." He explained that such conduct qualifies as holy foolery only if the audience believes that the individual is sane, moral, and pious. The Eastern Orthodox Church holds that holy fools voluntarily take up the guise of insanity in order to conceal their perfection from the world, and thus avoid praise.

Some characteristics that were commonly seen in holy fools were going around half-naked, being homeless, speaking in riddles,  being believed to be clairvoyant and a prophet, and occasionally being disruptive and challenging to the point of seeming immoral (though always to make a point).

Ivanov argued that, unlike in the past, modern yurodivy are generally aware that they look pathetic in others’ eyes. They strive to pre-empt this contempt through exaggerated self-humiliation, and following such displays they let it be known both that their behaviors were staged and that their purpose was to disguise their superiority over their audience.

Fools for Christ are often given the title of Blessed (блаженный), which does not necessarily mean that the individual is less than a saint, but rather points to the blessings from God that they are believed to have acquired.

The Eastern Orthodox Church records Isidora Barankis of Egypt (d. 369) among the first Holy Fools. However, the term was not popularized until the coming of Symeon of Emesa, who is considered to be a patron saint of holy fools.Holy Foolishness, by the Rev. Frank Logue, King of Peace Episcopal Church, Kingsland, Georgia, February 2002 In Greek, the term for Holy Fool is salos.

The practice was recognised in the hagiography of fifth-century Byzantium, and it was extensively adopted in Muscovite Russia, probably in the 14th century. The madness of the  Holy Fool  was ambiguous, and could be real or simulated.  He (or she) was believed to have been divinely inspired, and was therefore able to say truths which others could not, normally in the form of indirect allusions or parables.  He had a particular status in regard to the Tsars, as a figure not subject to earthly control or judgement.

The first reported fool-for-Christ in Russia was St. Procopius (Prokopiy), who came from the lands of the Holy Roman Empire to Novgorod, then moved to Ustyug, pretending to be a fool and leading an ascetic way of life (slept naked on church-porches, prayed throughout the whole night, received food only from poor people). He was abused and beaten, but finally won respect and became venerated after his death.

The Russian Orthodox Church numbers 36 yurodivye among its saints, starting from Procopius of Ustyug, and most prominently Basil Fool for Christ, who gives his name to Saint Basil's Cathedral in Moscow. One of the best-known modern examples in the Russian Church is perhaps St Xenia of Saint Petersburg.

 Common phrases or epithets 

Crazy for God 
"Crazy for God" is an expression sometimes used in the United States and other English speaking countries to convey a similar idea to "Foolishness for Christ."  It has been especially connected to the Unification Church of the United States.  In The Way of God's Will, a collection of sayings popular among church members, Unification Church founder Sun Myung Moon is quoted as saying: "We leaders should leave the tradition that we have become crazy for God."

In 1979 Unification Church critic Christopher Edwards titled a memoir about his experiences in the six months he spent as a church member: Crazy for God: The nightmare of cult life.In 2007, author Frank Schaeffer titled his autobiography Crazy for God: How I Grew Up as One of the Elect, Helped Found the Religious Right, and Lived to Take All (or Almost All) of It Back. It tells of his upbringing as the son of a well-known evangelical minister and his later conversion to the Greek Orthodox Church.

In the same year Stephen Prothero, author and chairman of Boston University's Department of Religion, wrote in the Harvard Divinity Bulletin: "I am crazy for people who are crazy for God: people nearly as inscrutable to me as divinity, who leave wives and children to become forest-dwelling monks in Thailand, who wander naked across the belly of India in search of self-realization, who speak in tongues and take up serpents in Appalachia because the Bible says they can."

Modern theology
One of the more recent works in theology is Fools for Christ by Jaroslav Pelikan. Through six essays dealing with various "fools," Pelikan explores the motif of fool-for-Christ in relationship to the problem of understanding the numinous:
The Holy is too great and too terrible when encountered directly for men of normal sanity to be able to contemplate it comfortably. Only those who cannot care for the consequences run the risk of the direct confrontation of the Holy. 

 The Yurodivy in art and literature 
There are a number of references to the yurodivy in 19th century Russian literature. The holy fool Nikolka is a character in Pushkin's play Boris Godunov and Mussorgsky's opera based on the play. In Pushkin's narrative poem The Bronze Horseman, the character of Evgenii is based in the tradition of the holy fools in his confrontation with the animated statue of Peter the Great.

The yurodivy appears several times in the novels of Dostoevsky. The Idiot explores the ramifications of placing a holy fool (the compassionate and insightful epileptic Prince Myshkin) in a secular world dominated by vanity and desire. According to Joseph Frank "though the gentlemanly and well-educated prince bears no external resemblance to these eccentric figures, he does possess their traditional gift of spiritual insight, which operates instinctively, below any level of conscious awareness or doctrinal commitment." In Demons, the madwoman Marya Lebyadkina displays many of the attributes of the holy fool, as do the characters of Sofya Marmeladova in Crime and Punishment and Lizaveta in The Brothers Karamazov.

Another fool-for-Christ is Grisha in Tolstoy's Childhood. Boyhood. Youth. Callis and Dewey described Grisha as follows:

He was an awesome figure: emaciated, barefoot and in rags, with eyes that "looked right through you" and long, shaggy hair. He always wore chains around his neck...Neighborhood children would sometimes run after him, laughing and calling out his name. Older persons, as a rule, viewed Grisha with respect and a little fear, especially when he suffered one of his periodic seizures and began to shout and rant. At such times adult bystanders would crowd around and listen, for they believed that the Holy Spirit was working through him.

Grisha's abnormal social conduct, seizures, and rants were common behaviors amongst holy fools. The esteem expressed by adults was also common. In his autobiography, Tolstoy expressed such esteem in reaction to overhearing Grisha praying:

“Oh Great Christian Grisha! Your faith was so strong that you felt the nearness of God; your love was so great that words flowed of their own will from your lips, and you did not verify them by reason. And what high praise you gave to the majesty of God, when, not finding any words, you prostrated yourself on the ground.”
A further example is Kasyan in the ninth sketch from Turgenev's Sketches from a Hunter's Album. The protagonist's coachman describes him as "one of those holy men," who lives by himself in the forest, strictly differentiates between eating bread which he calls "God's gift to man" and "tame creatures" on the one hand, and birds "of the free air" and creatures "of the forest and of the field" on the other hand, the latter of which he sees as being sinful. 

 Film references The Island (also known as Ostrov), a 2006 movie telling the life story of (fictional) Father Anatoly in 1970s Russia.
The Ostern Miles of Fire.The character Kayom in At Home Among Strangers, who quickly turns from foe to friend, can be seen as such a figure.
In the film Andrei Rublev, a jurodivyj character, "Durochka" (en. little fool girl) is played by director Andrei Tarkovsky's wife Irma Raush.

 See also 
 Andrew of Constantinople, the "Fool-for-Christ"
 Benedict Joseph Labre
 David the Dendrite
 Divine madness
 John of Moscow, the "Fool-For-Christ"
 John the Hairy
 Mast (Meher Baba)
 Nicholas the Pilgrim
 Sign of contradiction

 Notes 

 References Russia and the Russians, Geoffrey Hosking; 
Yurodstvo, by S.Kobets
 S.A. Ivanov. Symeon the New Theologian as Foolishness for Christ (in French)
 Georg Feuerstein. Holy Madness: The Shock Tactics and Radical Teachings of Crazy-Wise Adepts, Holy Fools and Rascal Gurus (Spirituality, Crazy-Wise Teachers, and Enlightenment). Hohm Press,  2006.
 Marius Kociejowski The Street Philosopher and the Holy Fool: A Syrian Journey'' Sutton Publishing, Stroud, 2004, contains much on holy folly in both the Christian and Islamic traditions
Svitlana Kobets, "From the Tabennisi nunnery to Pussy Riot: female holy fools in Byzantium and Russia," Canadian Slavonic Papers 60, no. 1–2 (2018)

Further reading 
 Petzold, H.G. (1968): Gottes heilige Narren. Hochland 2, 1968, 97–109.
 Petzold, H.G. (1977): "Zur Frömmigkeit der heiligen Narren". In: Die Einheit der Kirche. Festschrift für Peter Meinhold, hrsg. v. Lorenz Hein. Franz Steiner Verlag, Wiesbaden, 140–53.

External links 

Holy Fools for Christ
St. Andrew, Fool-for-Christ-sake

Christian asceticism
Yurodivy
Types of saints
Christian terminology
Biblical phrases